Marc Dorion (born June 22, 1987) is a Canadian ice sledge hockey player.

He was born with spina bifida, which meant he could not use his legs. He began to play ice sledge hockey when he was 4, at the Children's Hospital of Eastern Ontario, and has continued in the sport ever since.

He won gold at the 2006 Paralympics when he was 19, and was the team's youngest member. He has played for the Canadian national team since he was 16.

Honours
2010 Winter Paralympics
4th place
2009 IPC Ice Sledge Hockey World Championships
Bronze
2008 IPC Ice Sledge Hockey World Championships
Gold
2006 Winter Paralympics
Gold
2004 IPC Ice Sledge Hockey World Championships
4th place

External links
 
 
 Marc Dorion at the Canadian Paralympic Committee
 Marc Dorion at Hockey Canada
 

1987 births
Living people
Canadian sledge hockey players
Paralympic sledge hockey players of Canada
Paralympic gold medalists for Canada
Paralympic bronze medalists for Canada
Ice sledge hockey players at the 2006 Winter Paralympics
Ice sledge hockey players at the 2010 Winter Paralympics
Ice sledge hockey players at the 2014 Winter Paralympics
Medalists at the 2006 Winter Paralympics
Medalists at the 2014 Winter Paralympics
Ice hockey people from Ontario
People from Clarence-Rockland
People with spina bifida
Paralympic medalists in sledge hockey